Tajpur is a village in Yadadri Bhuvanagiri district of Telangana, India. It falls under Bhongir mandal. It will village have an old name as Mudampalli.

References

Villages in Yadadri Bhuvanagiri district